Edgewood High School is a public high school in Trenton, Ohio.  It is the only high school in the Edgewood City School District which serves students in the city of Trenton, the village of Seven Mile, and Wayne Township. The current facility opened in 2012 just outside the city of Trenton on Busenbark Road.

Athletics
Edgewood athletic teams are known as the Cougars. The Cougars and Lady Cougars compete in the Southwest Ohio Conference (SWOC) ].

Notable alumni 
Zach Apple, Olympic Gold Medalist, Professional Swimmer

Notes and references

External links
District website

High schools in Butler County, Ohio
Public high schools in Ohio
2012 establishments in Ohio